Jarceley is one of 54 parishes in Cangas del Narcea, a municipality within the province and autonomous community of Asturias, in northern Spain. 

The population is 147.

Villages
 Bárcena 
 Jarceley
 La Braña de Ordial
 Ordial
 Ovilley
 Pambley
 Villar de Lantero

References

Parishes in Cangas del Narcea